"The Living Proof" is a song by American recording artist Mary J. Blige for the soundtrack of the 2011 film The Help. The song was later included on her tenth studio album My Life II... The Journey Continues (Act 1) (2011). Blige composed the song along with the film's score composer Thomas Newman as well as Harvey Mason, Jr. and Damon Thomas from production team The Underdogs. "The Living Proof" is a traditional power ballad with contemporary R&B elements. The song garnered positive reviews from contemporary critics, who praised its lyrical content and Blige's vocals. It was nominated for the Best Original Song category at the 69th Golden Globe Awards, but lost to "Masterpiece", performed by Madonna.

Production
Essence.com explained the production of the song"

Charts

Weekly charts

References

External links
 MaryJBlige.com — official site

2010s ballads
2011 songs
Pop ballads
Mary J. Blige songs
Song recordings produced by the Underdogs (production team)
Songs with music by Thomas Newman
Songs written by Harvey Mason Jr.
Songs written by Damon Thomas (record producer)
Songs written by Mary J. Blige
Songs written for films
The Help
Soul ballads
Geffen Records singles